B. palustris may refer to:

 Brackenridgea palustris, a species of plant in the family Ochnaceae
 Boeckella palustris, a species of copepod that lives in South America

See also
 Palustris (disambiguation)